In mathematics, the Bessel potential is a potential (named after Friedrich Wilhelm Bessel) similar to the Riesz potential but with better decay properties at infinity.

If s is a complex number with positive real part then the Bessel potential of order s is the operator

where Δ is the Laplace operator and the fractional power is defined using Fourier transforms.

Representation in Fourier space

The Bessel potential acts by multiplication on the Fourier transforms: for each

Integral representations 

When , the Bessel potential on  can be represented by 
 

Here  denotes the Gamma function.

This last expression can be more succinctly written in terms of a modified Bessel function, for which the potential gets its name:

Asymptotics

In particular, when  the Bessel potential behaves asymptotically as the Riesz potential.

See also
 Riesz potential
 Fractional integration
 Sobolev space
 Fractional Schrödinger equation
Yukawa potential

References

 

Fractional calculus
Partial differential equations
Potential theory
Singular integrals